Max is an unincorporated community and census-designated place in Dundy County, Nebraska, United States. Max's population as of 2020 was 50.

Max is located in eastern Dundy County, along U.S. Route 34 in the valley of the Republican River.

Demographics

History
The first settlement at Max was made in 1880.  The community named itself in honor of the postmaster, Max Monivisin.

References

Census-designated places in Dundy County, Nebraska
Census-designated places in Nebraska